Crataerina acutipennis, is a species of biting fly in the family of louse flies Hippoboscidae. Its hosts are swift species including the little, white-rumped, Horus, pallid and plain swifts.

References

External links 

Parasitic flies
Parasites of birds
Hippoboscidae
Insects described in 1926